Alexandr Sergeevich Kharitonov (born 8 November 1986) is a Russian chess grandmaster (2006).

Biography
Kharitonov repeatedly represented Russia at the European Youth Chess Championships and World Youth Chess Championships in different age groups, where he won three medals: gold (in 2002, at the European Youth Chess Championship in the U16 age group), silver (in 2003, at the World Youth Chess Championship in the U18 age group) and bronze (in 2003, at the European Youth Chess Championship in the U18 age group).

He is a winner of many international chess tournaments, including winning of first prize in Ryazan (2001), Ostrava (2002), Jeseník (2002), Eforie (2004, 2005).

In 2002, Kharitonov was awarded the FIDE International Master (IM) title and received the FIDE Grandmaster (GM) title four year later.

References

External links
 
 
 
 

1986 births
Living people
Russian chess players
Chess grandmasters